Gaon The Village No More  is an Indian film directed by the filmmaker Gautam Singh. The film stars Shadab Kamal, Omkar Das Manikpuri, Shishir Sharma and Neha Mahajan.

The film is scheduled to release on October 26, 2018.

Plot 
This film is inspired by director Gautam Singh Sigdar’s own village in Jharkhand, India. The film talks about the way the element of money impacts the society. It attempts to showcase the journey that India has gone through in the last 200 years in a nutshell.
Bharat, the village, is self-reliant with everyone contributing towards the well being of the rest of the villagers. Things dramatically transforms when an outsider, called Bharat, enters the village. The village Bharat and the man Bharat represent diametrically opposite interpretations of ideas.

Cast 
Shadab Kamal – Bharat
Neha Mahajan – Sango
Gopal K Singh – Vaid Ji
 Dibyendu Bhattacharya – Belu 
Rohit Pathak –  Mangla
Omkar Das Manikpuri – Shambhu
Shishir Sharma – Surjeet 
Praveena Deshpande – Bharat’s mother

Production
The film took five years to complete as director Gautam Singh was made it while he held a full-time job in Qatar.

References

External links
 

2018 films
Indian drama films
2010s Hindi-language films
2018 drama films
Hindi-language drama films